In organic chemistry, an isodiazene, also known by the incorrectly constructed (but commonly used) name 1,1-diazene or systematic name diazanylidene, is an organic derivative of the parent isodiazene (H2N+=N–, also called 1,1-diimide) with general formula R1R2N+=N–.  The functional group has two major resonance forms, a diazen-2-ium-1-ide form, and an aminonitrene form:

Although isodiazenes are formally isoelectronic with ketones and aldehydes, the reactivity of this exotic functional group is very different.  They are generally prepared by oxidation of the hydrazine (R2N–NH2), reduction of the 1,1-diazene oxide (R2N–N=O), 1,1-elimination of MX from  R2N–NMX (M = Na, K; X = SO2Ar), or treatment of secondary amines with Angeli's salt, Na2N2O3, in the presence of acid.  Isodiazenes participate in cycloaddition reactions with alkenes to generate N-aminoaziridines.  In the absence of other reactants, they undergo reactions in which N2 is eliminated to give an organic residue or residues through both concerted and nonconcerted pathways.  Cyclic isodizenes in particular readily undergo cycloelimination and chelotropic elimination reactions.  Some of these reactions are believed to be concerted pericyclic processes, as evidenced by stereospecificity that is consistent with the conservation of orbital symmetry.
The absence of cyclobutane from the decomposition of the isodiazene derived from the saturated 5-membered azacycle is evidence against radical intermediates, and the process is also believed to be concerted and pericyclic.

Due to the facile elimination of N2, most isodiazenes can only be isolated in a matrix at cryogenic temperatures.  A small number of highly hindered derivatives with tertiary R groups (e.g., R1= R2 = t-Bu, stable at –127 °C, decomposes at –90 °C; R1—R2 = C(CH3)2CH2CH2CH2(CH3)2C, stable up to –78 °C) are isolable by preparation and chromatography or filtration at low temperature as red solutions.  

Isodiazenes have been observed to serve as ligands in transition metals complexes, including those of molybdenum and vanadium.

See also 

 Diazene
 Ylide
 Nitrene

References 

Functional groups
Reactive intermediates